Tiantai or T'ien-t'ai is an East Asian Buddhist school of Mahāyāna Buddhism that developed in 6th-century China. The school emphasizes the Lotus Sutra's doctrine of the "One Vehicle" (Ekayāna) as well as Mādhyamaka philosophy, particularly as articulated in the works of the fourth patriarch Zhiyi (538–597 CE). Brook Ziporyn, professor of ancient and medieval Chinese religion and philosophy, states that Tiantai Buddhism is "the earliest attempt at a thoroughgoing Sinitic reworking of the Indian Buddhist tradition." According to Paul Swanson, scholar of Buddhist studies, Tiantai Buddhism grew to become "one of the most influential Buddhist traditions in China and Japan." 

The name of the school is derived from the fact that Zhiyi lived on Tiantai Mountain (Tiantai means "platform of the sky"), which then became a major center for the tradition. Zhiyi is also regarded as the first major figure to form an indigenous Chinese Buddhist system. Tiantai is sometimes also called "The Lotus School", after the central role of the Lotus Sutra in its teachings.

During the Sui dynasty, the Tiantai school became one of the leading schools of Chinese Buddhism, with numerous large temples supported by emperors and wealthy patrons. The school's influence waned and was revived again through the Tang dynasty and also rose again during the Song dynasty. Chinese Tiantai remains a living tradition to this day, being particularly strong in Hong Kong. 

The Japanese Tendai school is also an influential tradition which branched off from Tiantai during the 9th century, and played a major role in the development of Japanese Buddhism. A Korean offshoot, the Cheontae school, was also established during the 12th century. Furthermore, Tiantai (and its offshoots) were very influential in the development of other forms of East Asian Buddhism, such as Zen and Pure Land.

History

Unlike earlier schools of Chinese Buddhism, the Tiantai school was entirely of Chinese origin. The schools of Buddhism that had existed in China prior to the emergence of the Tiantai are generally believed to represent direct transplantations from India, with little modification to their basic doctrines and methods. However, Tiantai grew and flourished as a native Chinese Buddhist school under the 4th patriarch, Zhiyi, who developed an original and extensive Chinese Buddhist system of doctrine and practice through his many treatises and commentaries. The main center of the school was located in Zhejiang province's Tiantai Mountain, which also gives the school its name.

Over time, the Tiantai school became doctrinally broad, able to absorb and give rise to other movements within Buddhism, though without any formal structure. The tradition emphasized both scriptural study and meditative practice, and taught the rapid attainment of Buddhahood through observing the mind.

The school is largely based on the teachings of Zhiyi, Zhanran, and Zhili, who lived between the 6th and 11th centuries in China. These teachers took an approach called "classification of teachings" (panjiao 判教) in an attempt to harmonize the numerous and often contradictory Buddhist texts that had come into China. This was achieved through a particular interpretation of the Lotus Sūtra.

Early figures
The Indian Buddhist philosopher Nāgārjuna is traditionally taken to be the first patriarch of the Tiantai school. Madhyamaka works associated with Nāgārjuna like the Chung lun ("Madhyamakaśāstra"; Taishō 1564) and the Dà zhìdù lùn (T. no. 1509) are important sources for the Tiantai school.

The sixth century dhyāna master Huiwen is traditionally considered to be the second patriarch of the Tiantai school. Huiwen studied the works of Nāgārjuna, and is said to have awakened to the profound meaning of Nāgārjuna's words: "All conditioned phenomena I speak of as empty, and are but false names which also indicate the mean."

Huiwen later transmitted his teachings to Chan master Nanyue Huisi (515-577), who is traditionally figured as the third patriarch. During meditation, he is said to have realized the "Lotus Samādhi", indicating enlightenment and Buddhahood. He authored the Ta Ch'eng Chih Kuan (Mahāyāna-śamatha-vipaśyanā). 

Huisi then transmitted his teachings to Zhiyi (538-597), traditionally figured as the fourth patriarch of Tiantai, who is said to have practiced the Lotus Samādhi and to have become enlightened quickly. He authored many treatises such as explanations of the Buddhist texts, and especially systematic manuals of various lengths which explain and enumerate methods of Buddhist practice and meditation. The above lineage was proposed by Buddhists of later times and do not reflect the popularity of the monks at that time.

Zhiyi

Scholars such as Paul Loren Swanson consider Zhiyi (Chinese: 智顗, 538–597 CE) to have been the major founder of the Tiantai school as well as one of the greatest Chinese Buddhist philosophers. He was the first to systematize and popularize the complex synthesis of Tiantai doctrine as an original Chinese tradition.

Zhiyi analyzed and organized all the Āgamas and Mahayana sutras into a system of five periods and eight types of teachings.  For example, many elementary doctrines and bridging concepts had been taught early in the Buddha's advent when the vast majority of the people during his time were not yet ready to grasp the 'ultimate truth'.  These Āgamas were an upaya, or skillful means - an example of the Buddha employing his boundless wisdom to lead those people towards the truth. Subsequent teachings delivered to more advanced followers thus represent a more complete and accurate picture of the Buddha's teachings, and did away with some of the philosophical 'crutches' introduced earlier.  Zhiyi's classification culminated with the Lotus Sutra, which he held to be the supreme synthesis of Buddhist doctrine. The difference on Zhiyi's explanation to the Golden Light Sutra caused a debate during the Song dynasty.

Zhiyi's Tiantai school received much imperial support during the Sui dynasty, because of this, it was the largest Buddhist school at the beginning of the Tang and thus suffered because of its close relationship with the house of Sui.

Zhanran

After Zhiyi, Tiantai was eclipsed for a time by newer schools such as the East Asian Yogācāra (Fǎxiàng-zōng), and Huayan schools, until the 6th patriarch Jingxi Zhanran (711-782) revived the school and defended its doctrine against rival schools such as the Huayan and Faxiang. The debates between the Faxiang school and the Tiantai school concerning the notion of universal Buddhahood were particularly heated, with the Faxiang school asserting that different beings had different natures and therefore would reach different states of enlightenment, while the Tiantai school argued in favor of the Lotus Sutra teaching of Buddhahood for all beings. Zhanran's view of Buddha nature was expanded in his Jingangpi or "Diamond Scalpel," which is the 'locus classicus' of the doctrine of "the Buddha-nature of Insentient Beings." According to Shuman Chen, Zhanran:

provides his rationale primarily from the perspective of the all-pervasive quality of Buddha-nature, which he considers synonymous with suchness. This rationale indicates that external tangible objects like water, buildings, and flora, formless sounds and smells, and internal thoughts or ideas all possess Buddha-nature. This is because Sakyamuni Buddha and any other Buddha's meritorious qualities in their practice leading to enlightenment and in the resultant realization do not reject anything, instead embracing all. In the Tiantai terminology, the Buddha and all beings mutually include, inter-pervade, and are identical to each other.Zhanran writes:"Every blade of grass, tree, pebble, and particle of dust is perfectly endowed with buddha nature ...The practitioner of the perfect teaching, from beginning to end, knows that ultimate principle is nondual and that there are no objects apart from mind. Who then is sentient? What then is insentient? Within the assembly of the Lotus, there is no discrimination."

Post-Tang crisis and Song revival

After Zhanran, Tiantai declined once again. Brook Ziporyn writes that this period has been seen as the second dark age of Tiantai, a state of crisis "extending from the Tang into the Five Dynasties and Northern Song, an age marked internally by the deterioration of distinctive Tiantai ideas and marked externally by the loss of crucial texts and monastic institutions, especially after the persecution of 845 (a period that saw the increased influence of Chan)."

During this period, Huayan and Chan influences made strong inroads into Tiantai thought. Zhanran's disciple and seventh patriarch Daosui, and syncretic figures such as Zhi Yuan (768-844) and Daochang Ningfen all combined Tiantai with Chan ideas (particularly of the Heze school). Daosui (Chinese: 道邃; pinyin: Dàosuì), is important because he was the primary teacher of Saichō, the founder of the Japanese Tiantai tradition (known in Japanese as Tendai). Other Tiantai syncretists include Deshao (881-972) who was associated with the Fayen branch of Chan and his student Yongming Yenshou (954-974) who attempted to unify Tiantai, Huayen and Yogacara teachings under a kind of idealism influenced by Zongmi, emphasizing what he called the "one pure formless mind".

This situation led to the famous debate within the Tiantai school known as the "home mountain" (shanjia) vs. "off mountain" (shanwai) debate. "Off mountain" supporters, as they were later polemically termed, supported these new doctrines (such as the "one pure mind") claiming they were originally Tiantai doctrines, while "home mountain" supporters saw the original Tiantai view as different and superior to this new view influenced by Chan and Huayan doctrines (especially by Zongmi's works). The most eminent figure during this debate was Patriarch Siming Zhili (960-1028), who wrote various commentaries on Zhiyi's works and defended the "Home mountain" view. Zhili's major criticisms included attacking Chan's failure to understand the necessity of the use of words and scriptural study as part of practice as well as criticizing Zongmi's view of a pure mind as the buddha-nature, arguing instead that the "three truths" as taught by Zhiyi are the ultimate reality. For Zhili, mind or consciousness has no special status relative to other types of dharmas, such as physical matter.

Over time, Zhili's "home mountain" view turned out to be victorious, and his works became part of the orthodox Tiantai canon during the Song dynasty. Ciyun Zunshi (964-1032) was another important figure in this second Tiantai revival. His work focused on the promotion of rituals for lay Buddhists and worked on converting the populace away from using blood, meat and alcohol for funerary and ancestral rites. Ciyi also promoted the practice of adopting local Chinese deities and spirits into the Buddhist religion as "vassals" or "retainers" and strongly promoted repentance rituals.

These two figures were also associated with the popularization of Pure Land practices through the foundation of lay societies (lotus societies, lianshe). Tiantai monk Mao Ziyuan (1096?-1166) took this one step further by establishing what became known as the "White Lotus Society" which allowed both men and women to attend together and even to preach and be in charge of society repentance halls as married clergy.

Due to the efforts of these major Tiantai figures, the school became one of the dominant forms of Buddhism during the Song, alongside of Chan.

Yuan, Ming and Qing

The defeat of the Song dynasty was a serious blow to Tiantai which suffered another setback during the Yuan dynasty which supported Tibetan Buddhism, while Chan Buddhism continued to grow in popularity while attacking the legitimacy of other schools. This period saw the Tiantai figure Huxi Huaize (fl. 1310) write his polemical treatise Record of Tiantai's Transmission of the Buddha's Mind-seal as an effort to defend the Tiantai tradition against Chan critiques.

The Ming Dynasty saw further religious revivals among the major Chinese Buddhist schools, including Tiantai, particularly under the reign of the Buddhist friendly Wanli Emperor. One of the main figures of the Ming Tiantai Buddhist revival is Miaofeng Zhenjue (1537-1589), who lectured widely and whose students revived ancestral Tiantai monasteries such as Gaoming and Ayuwang. 

Youxi Chuandeng (1554-1628), a student of Miaofeng, was also another important figure who wrote a work entitled "On Nature Including Good and Evil" which presents his ideas on doctrinal classification, the principle of nature-inclusion, and the practice of the Dharma-gate of inherent evil attempting to harmonize these with Confucianism and the thought of the Śūraṃgama Sūtra. Chuandeng was also instrumental in rebuilding Gaoming monastery which had been abandoned by this time.

Tianxi Shoudeng (1607-1675) was one of the most influential teachers and exegetes of Tiantai during the Qing Dynasty.

Modern era 

The most influential figure in modern Tiantai, who carried the Tiantai lineage (specifically the Lingfeng lineage) from the late Qing into the 20th century was Dixian. His student, the monk Tanxu (1875 – 1963), is known for having rebuilt various temples during the Republican era (such as Zhanshan temple in Qingdao) and for preserving the Tiantai lineage into the PRC era. During the Chinese Civil War, various dharma heirs of Dixian moved to Hong Kong, including Tanxu and Baojing. They helped establish the Tiantai tradition in Hong Kong, where it remains a strong living tradition today, being preserved by their dharma heirs. 

Baojing's dharma heir, Jueguang, helped establish the Guanzong Temple in Hong Kong and transmitted the lineage to numerous monks from Korea, Indonesia, Singapore, Taiwan and mainland China. Tanxuan's heir, Yongxing, founded Xifang Temple in Hong Kong as well as various temples in Malaysia and the United States (as well as the Texas Buddhist association and its Jade Buddha Temple). Furthermore, other monks from this lineage have helped to reintroduce the Tiantai tradition from Hong Kong back to the rest of mainland China, aiding in the reconstruction of Chinese Buddhism after the reform and opening up period.

The ancient Guoqing Temple at mount Tiantai, which had suffered from neglect and destruction, was renovated at the behest of Zhou Enlai. Guoqing Temple is now a major center of Chinese Tiantai Buddhism as well as remains a place of pilgrimage for Japanese Tendai Buddhists.

Texts

The Tiantai school takes the Lotus Sūtra as the main basis, the Mahāprajñāpāramitāupadeśa of Nāgārjuna as the guide, the Mahāyāna Mahāparinirvāṇa Sūtra as the support, and the Pañcaviṃśatisāhasrikā Prajñāpāramitā Sūtra (The Prajñāpāramitā Sūtra in 25,000 Lines) for methods of contemplation. The “Book of the Original Acts that Adorn the Bodhisattva,” (Pusa yingluo benye jing T. 24, No. 1485) is also a key text. Tiantai is often termed the ‘Four Sutras One Treatise School’ (四経一論) because of the strong influence of these texts on the tradition.

Apart from these, other classic Mahayana sutras are also important in Tiantai. The Avataṃsaka Sūtra is also very highly regarded in Tiantai and it is seen as one of the subtlest and deepest sutras and to belong to the class of "complete" teachings. The Vimalakīrti Sūtra is also seen as an important sutra in Tiantai. Zhiyi wrote a commentary on this sutra, the Wuimo yiji (維摩義記 T1776). 

Indeed, the Tiantai school's study makes use of numerous sources. As noted by Donner and Stevenson:When we examine the early [Tiantai] exegetical and textual record, we find that [Zhiyi] and his successors compiled treatises…for any number of sūtras other than the Lotus, including such long-standing Chinese favorites as the Vimalakīrti, Nirvāṇa, Suvarṇaprabhāsa, and various Pure Land sūtras. Not only is there no evidence that one particular scripture was consistently promoted over others, but [Tang]-period sources indicate that the spiritual descendants of [Zhiyi] realigned [Taintai] doctrine freely in order to accommodate whatever sūtra caught their fancy.

Tiantai Treatises 
In addition to its doctrinal basis in Indian Buddhist texts, the Tiantai school also created its own meditation texts which emphasize the principles of śamatha and vipaśyanā. Of the Tiantai meditation treatises, Zhiyi's Concise Śamatha-vipaśyanā (小止観), Mahā-śamatha-vipaśyanā (摩訶止観), and Six Subtle Dharma Gates (六妙法門) are the most widely read in China. Rujun Wu identifies the work Mohe Zhiguan of Zhiyi as the seminal meditation text of the Tiantai school.

The Major Tiantai treatises studied in the tradition are the following works of Zhiyi:

The Three Great Tiantai Treatises: 
The Mohe Zhiguan (摩訶止觀・The Great Calming and Contemplation) 
Read with Zhanran's commentary: Zhiguan fuxing zhuan hongjue 止觀輔行傳弘決
The Fahua Xuanyi (法華玄義・The Profound Meaning of The Lotus Sutra)
Read with Zhanran's commentary: Fahua Xuanyi Shiqian 法華玄義釋籤
The Fahua Wenju (法華文句・The Words and Phrases of The Lotus Sutra)
Read with Zhanran's commentary: Fahua Wenju Ji 法華文句記

The Five Lesser Tiantai Treatises:
The Guanyin Pusa Pumenpin Xuanyi (觀音菩薩普門品玄義・The Profound Meaning of the Universal Gate of Avalokitesvara Bodhisattva Chapter) 
Read with the Zhili's commentary: Guanyin Xuanyi Ji 觀音玄義記
The Guanyin Pusa Pumenpin Yishu (觀音菩薩普門品義疏・ The Commentary on the Universal Gate of Avalokitesvara Bodhisattva Chapter)
Read with Zhili's commentary: Guanyin Yishu Ji 觀音義疏記 
The Jinguangming Jing Xuanyi (金光明經玄義・The Profound Meaning of the Golden Light Sutra) 
Read with Zhili's Commentary: Jinguangming Jing Xuanyi Shiyi Ji 金光明經玄義拾遺記
The Jinguangming Jing Wenju (金光明經文句・ The Words and Phrases of the Golden Light Sutra). 
Read with Zhili's commentary: Jinguangming Jing Wenju Ji 金光明經 文句記
The Guan Wuliangshoufo Jingshu (観無量寿佛經疏・The Commentary on the Buddha of Immeasurable Life Sutra)
Read with Zhili's commentary: Miaozongchao 妙宗鈔

Philosophy 
David Chappell lists the most important Tiantai teachings as being The Threefold Truth and the corresponding Threefold Contemplation, The Fourfold Teachings, The Subtle Dharma, and The Non-conceivable Discernment (or the "Inconceivable Mind"). Brook Ziporyn writes that Tiantai's "rigorous theoretical edifice" uses "modes of argumentation and praxis that are derived squarely from Indian Buddhism" but applies these "in the service of ideals and metaphysical conclusions that are rooted deeply in the indigenous philosophical traditions."

The Threefold Truth 
The Tiantai school's main philosophical principle is The Threefold Truth (emptiness, existence, and the middle; 空假中 kong, jia, zhong). According to Paul Swanson, this is the "central insight" around which the Tiantai system revolves. This view was developed by Zhiyi's reading of Nāgārjuna's Madhyamaka philosophy, especially its doctrine of two truths. The Threefold Truth comprises the following:

 All phenomena are empty (śūnya, 空 kong) of any independent self-nature or essence (svabhava), this corresponds to the Mahayana concept of the "ultimate" or real (paramārtha) truth and emptiness (shunyata) which Zhiyi defines as "the sign of the true nature of reality."
 Phenomena exist (假, jia) in a provisional manner, they can be said to conventionally arise through causes and conditions (i.e. dependent origination). This corresponds to the conventional or mundane truth (saṁvṛti) of the classic Mahayana two truths, which Zhiyi glosses as "the twelvefold conditioned co-arising of ignorance" and as "illusory existence".
 The middle truth (中, zhong): phenomena are both empty of existence and exist provisionally. According to Dan Lusthaus: "it is ‘middle’ because neither the provisional nor the empty truth about the table fully captures its reality. It is both provisional and empty, and simultaneously neither provisional nor empty. As Zhiyi put it, ‘wondrous being is identical to true emptiness’." Swanson writes that this is "a simultaneous affirmation of both emptiness and conventional existence as aspects of a single integrated reality." The middle truth for Zhiyi transcends all dualities and avoid all extremes, such as existence and non-existence, being and emptiness, mundane truth and real truth, or defilement and purity.
While the threefold truth can be explained conceptually in this way, for Zhiyi, the highest and most subtle meaning of the threefold truth is ultimately indescribably and beyond words. It is also fully integrated and inclusive of all the Buddhadharma and of all mundane and ultimate truths as well. According to Zhiyi, "the supreme truth of the middle path" is "the reality of non-duality", as well as "the enlightened perception of all Buddhas and bodhisattvas." Zhiyi also states that it is also called "the truth of one reality", as well as "emptiness" (空 kong), "Buddha-nature" (佛性 fóxìng), Thusness (Skt. tathātā, 如如), tathāgatagarbha (如来藏), and the Dharmadhatu (法界).

According to Paul Swanson, this doctrine arose from the need to make explicit the relationship between the first and second truths of classical Indian Mahayana (an issue which also may have led to the development of Yogacara's "three natures"). Zhiyi developed his theory of a threefold truth by drawing on Nāgārjuna's Mūlamadhyamakakārikā, which explains the two truths as: "We state that whatever is dependent arising, that is emptiness. That is dependent upon convention. That itself is the middle path" (MMK, XXIV.18). Swanson states that this doctrine is a way of expressing three aspects of a single integrated reality. 

Swanson also notes that various scholars have criticized Zhiyi for adding a third "truth", when no Indian author explains Madhyamaka this way. However, according to Swanson, the major point of Zhiyi's analysis is that reality is a single integrated truth (which may be explained with two or three aspects). As such, it is not a deviation from classical Madhyamaka according to Swanson. Swanson thinks that one of the main reasons for this development is that it was a useful device for undoing Chinese misunderstandings of the two truths (such as seeing them as referring to being and non-being, to two separate levels of reality or to an essential reality and its functions).

The Threefold Contemplation 
The Threefold Truth may be contemplated independently as the "three contemplations", an important theme in Zhiyi's Mo ho chi kuan. The threefold contemplation, also described as the threefold cessation and insight, consists of what Zhiyi calls a "graded contemplation":

 Cessation as insight into the true essence of reality - This consists in contemplating the emptiness of all phenomena and their lack of own being (svabhava). 
 Cessation as insight into expedient conditions - This consists in contemplating the conventional existence of all things, i.e. dependent arising or as Zhiyi describes it "the non-emptiness of emptiness", which means that emptiness is not nothingness. 
 Cessation as an end to both discriminatory extremes - A contemplation which is the simultaneous unity of both 1 and 2 and which is totally beyond conceptualization and thought. 
There are different levels of subtlety of this threefold contemplation, the deepest of which is when all three aspects are contemplated as a simultaneously non-dual unity which according to Zhiyi is when all three aspects are "present in one thought" (一心) which is "beyond conceptual understanding". According to Chappell:The first contemplation involves moving from the world of provisionality to seeing its emptiness, which is a different process from the second contemplation in which we move beyond emptiness and back into an acceptance of the role of provisional existence. Only in the third contemplation do we find the balance involving the previous two insights based on the Middle Path of the One Mind.

The One Vehicle 
A central doctrine of Tiantai is the Lotus Sutras doctrine of the One Vehicle or ekayāna (traditional Chinese: 一乘; pinyin: yīchéng). This doctrine provided a unifying and inclusive framework which could be used to understand all Buddhist teachings. According to Jacqueline Stone, Zhiyi's view of the One Vehicle of the Lotus Sutra is that conventionally, it is "subtle" and "wonderful" in comparison with lesser teachings which are coarse. However this is only true in a relative sense. Ultimately, the Lotus Sutra's Subtle Dharma is "not established in comparison to anything else, for there is nothing outside it to which it might be compared." From this absolute perspective, the Lotus Sutra's One Vehicle is "open and integrated" according to Zhiyi, and includes all other Buddhist teachings and skillful means. From the ultimate point of view, all distinctions of "true" and "provisional" are dissolved since all teachings are expressions of the One Vehicle. 

According to Stone, "this is an egalitarian, inclusive reading, in which all teachings in effect become "true". But from the relative standpoint, a clear distinction is preserved between the "true" and the "provisional"; this is a hierarchical, potentially even exclusive reading, which emphasizes the superiority of the Lotus Sutra over other teachings."

 The Unity of the Dharmadhatu 
Since the three truths are one, and this truth is a single unity, Tiantai thinkers see the whole of reality is as being a single interpenetrating whole, one integrated existence. This holism is described in different ways, such as "the interinclusiveness of the ten realms" or "the interpenetrating unity of all aspects of reality". According to Swanson, in this view, "everything contains everything else, and the whole contains all things." Zhiyi illustrates this idea with the simile of the drunk man from the Mahāparinirvāṇa Sūtra, who perceives the sun as spinning around due to his condition, but in reality there is just one sun and this is confirmed by sober people. However, Zhiyi also points out that even this idea of "one truth" is just a concept, and as such it is ultimately inadequate, since "each and every truth is inexpressible" and "the one truth actually no truth".

According to Brook Ziporyn, the Tiantai school's holism is derived from an extremely important passage from the Lotus Sutra which states: Only a Buddha together with a Buddha knows the ultimate reality of all things: how they appear, what their natures are, what they're made of, what they are capable of, what they are doing, what their causes are, what their conditions are, what their effects are, what their consequences are, and the way in which all these factors from beginning to end are equally ultimate and are ultimately one and the same.Ziporyn argues that this passage points at the idea "that each particular aspect of the world as we see it and feel it is ultimately real, that each one is in fact the Absolute itself, the Buddha-nature, the final fact about the universe" and that "each thing, each appearance, each action" is "the ultimate reality “of ” all other things."

 Three Thousand Realms in One Thought Moment 
One of the ways this doctrine is explained is the idea of "Three Thousand Realms in a Single Thought Moment" or "The Presence of All Three Thousand Aspects of Existence as Each Moment of Experience" (一念三千). According to this teaching, the various realms of existence of Buddhist cosmology are all interconnected and interpenetrating. Furthermore, each of these states of existence can be experienced in one's own mind, and can therefore be seen as a kind of experience and a way of seeing the world, as well as a realm of rebirth. As Zhiyi writes:One thought [or mind] contains the ten dharma realms. Each dharma realm also contains the ten dharma realms [so there are] one hundred dharma realms. Each dharma realm contains thirty worlds; so one hundred dharma realms contain three thousand worlds. These three thousand worlds are contains in one thought.According to Swanson, the main idea here is that "all reality is interpenetrating and inclusive, so that one short thought contains all of reality." Jacqueline Stone explains this as the idea that an any single ordinary thought and all phenomena in the universe "exist at each moment in a mutually inclusive relationship." Furthermore, the figure three thousand is "the product of multiplying specific numerical dharma categories: the ten realms of sentient beings, their mutual inclusion, the ten suchnesses and the three realms." According to Stone, this concept also:represents a totalistic view of interdependent reality: the Buddha and ordinary worldlings, body and mind, cause and effect, subject and object, sentient and non-sentient are mutually encompassed in every moment of thought.Even though reality is a unified whole, the Dharmadhatu (法界), it can be explained in different ways according to Zhiyi (such as the two truths, and the threefold truth, and the ten realms). Two other schemas which Zhiyi employs are the Three Subtle Dharmas (sentient beings, Buddha and mind) and the Ten Suchnesses (which is drawn from the second chapter of the Lotus Sutra) to explain the various realms and how they have the same nature of the threefold truth. 

Since reality is unified in these ways, by contemplating one's mind and thought, one can contemplate the whole of reality and thus Buddhahood itself. Zhiyi explains this by commenting on a passage from the Avatamsaka Sutra which states that "if one disports one's mind in the dharmadhatu as if in space, then one will know the objective realm of all Buddhas." According to Zhiyi:"The dharmadhatu is the middle. Space is emptiness. The mind and Buddhas are conventional existence. The three together are the objective realm of all Buddhas. This means that if one contemplates [the thoughts of] one's mind, one can become endowed with all Buddha-dharmas." Zhiyi also calls the single reality "the inconceivable mind" (不思議心 pu ssu i hsin), which contains all three thousand dharmas and the threefold truth.

 Buddhahood 

In his Profound Meaning of the Lotus Sutra (法華玄義  Chin Fa-hua-hsüan-i) Zhiyi explains Buddhahood by means of three ways of understanding the causes for Buddhahood and three ways of understanding the result of Buddhahood. The three ways of understanding the causes (which are three ways of saying the same thing) are as follows: 

 Each of the ten dharma realms contains the other nine realms.
 Therefore, the nine realms other than Buddhahood are integrated with Buddhahood. All possess the potential for Buddhahood.
 The ten realms are empty of inherent existence, and they are of the nature of the threefold truth.

The three ways of understanding the result, Buddhahood, are as follows: 

 Buddhahood pervades the entire universe, as Swanson says "it is not a separate realm detached from our world of experience, but an integral and fundamental part of it."
 The Buddha attained Buddhahood incalculable aeons ago as it is said in the Lotus Sutra
 The Buddha manifests in many different forms for the benefit of all sentient beings.
Therefore, according to Zhiyi, the Buddha-realm is deeply integrated with all other aspects of reality. Zhiyi writes: How can there be any dharma distinct from the Buddha? There cannot. All of the hundred realms and thousand suchnesses are the objective realm of the Buddha.Thus, Buddhahood is not detached from the rest of reality, but integrated with it. The difference is that a Buddha knows reality as it really is. As such, the three subtle dharmas (sentient beings, Buddhas and mind) are part interfused with each other and are part of a single whole. Zhiyi quotes the Avatamsaka sutra which states that "the mind, the Buddha, and sentient beings are not distinct."

 Buddha-nature 
Zhiyi's Profound Meaning of the Lotus Sutra also explains Buddha-nature through three parallel aspects: 

 Buddha-nature as the conditional causes of Buddhahood - Swanson explains this ability to practice the Dharma as the "inherent potential and propensity for Buddhahood within all sentient beings which allows them to practice and build up the proper causes and conditions for attaining Buddhahood."
 Buddha-nature as the complete cause of Buddhahood - This is the inherent potential for wisdom in all sentient beings, this is the wisdom that can destroy delusion and reveal the true nature of reality. It is a presence of wisdom which just needs to be uncovered.
Buddha-nature as the direct cause of Buddhahood - This means that all beings are endowed with "the reality of true thusness", i.e. they all "participate in the true nature of reality."

 The Six Degrees of Identity 
Tiantai's explanation of the path of the bodhisattva was set forth in Zhiyi's doctrines of the Six Degrees of Identity and the Six Bodhisattva Stages. 

The Six Degrees of Identity provide an important path schema for the Tiantai school. Ziporyn summarizes these six degrees of realization as follows: 

 Identity in principle: "the objective fact that all things are Buddha; that whether they know it or not they are of the nature of enlightenment. Buddhahood at this level is still pure unrealized potentiality, inherent in all things." 
 Identity in name: "certain beings hear the doctrine, "You are identical to Buddha," and if they believe it, they are identical in name; they have this cognitive knowledge of the principle that all are Buddhas."
 Identity in contemplation and practice: "after accepting this doctrine, these beings become Buddhists and practice the Buddhist path and make progress toward manifesting this inherent potential Buddhahood." 
 Identity of semblance: "further progress into the ranks and levels of Buddhist mythology." 
 Partial realization: "the highest ranks of bodhisattva practice." 
 Ultimate identity: "becoming an actual Buddha in practice."

 Non-dual Ethics 
This non-dual Tiantai teaching of the interfusion of all phenomena and experiences also holds that there is a non-duality of good and evil, which also applies to happiness and suffering, Buddha and Mara (the demon of Death). As noted by Ziporyn, the view that "each experience we have includes not only itself but also all other experiences of all other sentient beings at all times" is related to the idea that  "Buddhahood inherently includes every form of evil, that these evils can never be destroyed, and that they do not need to be destroyed (“The evil inherent in the Buddha-nature,” “Buddhahood does not cut off evil”)." Ziporyn further explains this seemingly paradoxical doctrine as follows: "our joy also includes sorrow, our sorrow also includes joy; our evil includes good, our good includes evil; our delusion includes enlightenment, our enlightenment includes delusion."

 The Subtle Dharma: One Reality, One Vehicle, many Skillful Means 
The Tiantai school's soteriology is based on the doctrine of the "One Vehicle" (Skt. ekayāna, traditional Chinese: 一乘; pinyin: Yīchéng) found in the Lotus Sutra. Tiantai sees all the various Buddhist teachings, scriptures and practices as being part of a single holistic vehicle (yana) leading to Buddhahood.

The discrepancies and seeming contradictions are only due to the fact that these various teachings are all "expedient means" (upāya) that are taught according to the different needs and capacities of sentient beings. According to Zhiyi, even though there numerous sutras with many varied teachings, the intent of the Buddha is to lead all sentient beings to Buddhahood. Similarly, just as there are different practices, there are different ways to describe the same unified reality (i.e. emptiness and the threefold truth). Thus, Zhiyi states in the Fa hua hsuan i "various terms name one ultimate reality. Only one ultimate reality is given many names." This ultimate reality is "one yet many, many yet one". It is many because there are diverse phenomena that arise and perish dependent on causes and conditions and it is one because all of this is equally empty. 

Indeed, Zhiyi outlines four types of oneness: the oneness of the teachings (all teachings of the Buddha are non-contradictory and have one intent), the oneness of the practices (all lead to Buddhahood), the oneness of persons (all will attain Buddhahood), and the oneness of reality. According to Zhiyi, any text which is consistent with these concept teaches "the Subtle Dharma" (miao-fa). 

Tiantai thought also provides a classificatory schema (panjiao) to explain how the different texts and teachings relate to each other. From the Tiantai point of view, the One Vehicle teaching of the Lotus is called a ‘Round Teaching’, which means that it encircles everything, and lacks any sharp edges or divisions. The Tiantai view is that the highest teaching is a holistic and all encompassing teaching which includes all Buddhist views and practices.

 Classification of teachings 
An extension of Tiantai's doctrine of the One Vehicle is its classification of the Buddha's teachings into the "Five Periods and Eight Teachings." This classification is usually attributed to Zhiyi, but is probably a later development. This classification of teachings was also done by other schools, such as the Fivefold Classification of the Huayan school.

 Five Periods 
The Five Periods are five periods in the life of the Buddha in which, according to Tiantai exegetes, he delivered different teachings, aimed at different audiences with a different level of understanding. The Five Periods are: 

 The Avatamsaka Period. For twenty-one days after his awakening, the buddha delivered the Avatamsaka Sutra, one of the highest sutras, but this was not widely understood.
 The Agama Period. For twelve years, the Buddha preached the Agamas, including the preparatory teachings of the Four Noble Truths and dependent origination.
 The Vaipulya Period. For eight years, the Buddha delivered the Mahāyāna or Vaipūlya (expanded) teachings, such as the Vimalakirti Sutra, the Śrīmālādevī Sūtra, the Suvarnaprabhasa Sutra and other Mahāyāna sutras.
 The Prajña Period. For twenty-two years, the Buddha taught the Mahāyāna Prajñaparamita-sutras.
 The Lotus and Nirvana Period'''. In the last eight years, the Buddha preached the doctrine of the One Buddha Vehicle, and delivered the Lotus Sutra and the Nirvana Sutra just before his death.

 Eight Teachings 
The Eight Teachings are a classification of different types of Buddhist teaching. They consist of the Fourfold Teaching, and the Fourfold Method:Chappell (1987), p. 256.The Fourfold Teachings are called teachings because they are "that which discloses the principle and converts beings" according to Zhiyi. They are:

 Tripitaka Teaching: the Sutra, Vinaya and Abhidharma, in which the basic teachings are explained. According to David Chappell, the main elements of this teaching is "the thirty seven conditions for enlightenment, austerity, precepts, intellectual analysis of emptiness, the Six Perfections, and meditation" and the main view is the "arising-and-perishing among the ten realms of existence."
 Shared Teaching: the teaching of emptiness, which is shared by Mahayana and Theravāda. This corresponds to the first of the three contemplations and the practices of the ten stages of the bodhisattva that are shared with the Theravāda.
 Distinctive Teaching: the teachings of the Bodhisattva path. This corresponds to the second of the three contemplations. It "involves practices summarized by Chih-i into Fifty two Stages of a Bodhisattva" according to Chappell.
 Complete Teaching - the complete and perfect teaching, which is beyond words and concepts. It can be found in the Lotus Sutra and the Avatamsaka Sutra. This corresponds to the third of the three contemplations. According to Chappell, "the Complete Teaching moves beyond stages to see the identity and interpenetration of all the various practices, ideas, and values based on Suchness, Buddha-nature, and the Inconceivable Perceptual Process. Nevertheless, it also has its own set of unique practices such as the Five Repentances."The Fourfold Method: Gradual Teaching, a method for those with medium or inferior abilities that advances towards Buddhahood step by step
 Sudden Teaching, the Distinctive Teachings and the Complete Teaching for those with superior abilities
 Secret Teaching, teachings which are transmitted without the recipient being aware of it
 Variable Teaching, a method with no fixed teaching, but various teachings for various persons and circumstances
In the Ssu chiao i, Zhiyi states that Four Teachings are based on the Three Truths and Three Contemplations: The Four Teachings explained here arise from the threefold contemplations which were discussed above. They (i.e., the Four Teachings), in turn, actualize the threefold contemplations. First, the contemplation for entering emptiness from provisional existence includes two different methods of entering emptiness, analytical and experiential, which are clumsy and skillful (methods of entering emptiness, respectively). Because one can enter emptiness through the analysis of provisional existence, there arises the Tripitaka Teaching. Because one can enter emptiness through experiencing provisional existence (as empty), there arises the Shared Teaching. From within the second (contemplation) for entering provisional existence from emptiness, there arises the Distinct Teaching. From the third correct contemplation of the Middle Way in one mind, there arises the Complete Teaching.

 The Four Siddhanta 
Another way that Tiantai thinkers like Zhiyi classify the Buddhist teachings is through the four siddhantas, which are four principles that the Buddha used to teach the Dharma derived from the Da zhidu lun. According to David W. Chappell, the four siddhantas are:(1) First of all, the Buddha used ordinary or mundane modes of expression, (2) then he individualized his teaching and adapted it to the capacities of his listeners, (3) he further altered it in order to respond to and diagnose the spiritual defects of his hearers, and (4) finally all his teaching was based on the perfect and highest wisdom. The first three are conditioned and finite, whereas the last is inconceivable and ineffable.According to Chappell, the main idea of the Tiantai understanding of the Buddha's method of teaching is the "receptivity-and-response appropriate to a person's capacities", or "communication based on receptivity-and response". According to Chappell this means that "not only the form of the teaching, but also the quest for enlightenment (bodhicitta) arises during an interaction involving a response to the capacities and needs of a person."

Practice
According to Charles Luk, in China it has been traditionally held that the meditation methods of the Tiantai are the most systematic and comprehensive of all. Tiantai emphasizes meditation as the union of śamatha (止 zhǐ, calming or stabilizing meditation) and vipaśyanā (觀 guān, clear seeing or insight).

Regarding the functions of śamatha and vipaśyanā in meditation, Zhiyi writes in his work Concise Śamatha-vipaśyanā:

William R. LaFleur summarizes Zhiyi's understanding of zhǐ-guān (Japanese: shikan) as follows:These are recognized as two distinct phases or modes that are also united into one process. Śamatha, the first aspect of shikan, could be rendered as "standstill", the philosophical/meditational act through which the random and confused perceptions and cognitions of ordinary experience are brought to a stop and remain in a tranquil state. This stoppage makes possible (and is also made possible by) the second aspect of shikan. This is vipaśyanā, which could be rendered as "contemplation." This contemplation is directed toward objects of ordinary perception. It does not attempt to locate the "essences" of phenomena. The contemplator, in accord with the fundamental impermanence of all things (himself included), regards them without obstruction, that is, without the sort of discriminating mind that would seek to arrange phenomena into hierarchies of relative importance and select out some–primarily himself or some part of himself–as deserving of exemption from the rule of impartial impermanence.Zhiyi's magnum opus, the "Great Samatha-Vipasyana" (Móhē Zhǐguān), outlines his meditation system as consisting of 25 preparatory practices, four kinds of samadhi and ten modes of contemplation. Zhiyi saw the four samadhis as the main pillar of Tiantai meditation practice. Zhiyi writes:

Now if you wish to ascend to the stage of wondrous realization, you will not be able to reach it unless you practice. But if you become skilled at stirring and agitating [the raw milk], then the essence of ghee may be obtained. The Lotus Sutra says, "I also see the sons of Buddha cultivating all manner of practices in order to seek the path to Buddhahood." There are many methods of practice, but we may summarize them under four sorts: (I) constantly sitting, (2) constantly walking, (3) part walking part sitting, and (4) neither walking nor sitting. By referring to them collectively as "samadhis," we mean [that one thereby] attunes, rectifies, and stabilizes [the mind]. The Ta-[chih-tu]lun ("Great [Perfection of Wisdom] Treatise") says, "Skillfully to fix the mind on one spot and abide there without shifting-that is called samadhi."" The Dharmadhatu is a "single spot," and through true discernment you can abide there and never stray from it. These four types of activity constitute the supporting condition [for meditation]. By discerning the mind and resorting to the supporting condition [of the four activities], one attunes and rectifies [the mind]. For this reason we call them samadhis."

The Tiantai school also places a great emphasis on Mindfulness of Breathing (Skt. ) in accordance with the principles of śamatha and vipaśyanā. Zhiyi classifies breathing into four main categories: Panting (喘), Unhurried breathing (風), Deep and quiet breathing (氣), and Stillness or rest (息). Zhiyi holds that the first three kinds of breathing are incorrect, while the fourth is correct, and that the breathing should reach stillness and rest.

Influence
David Chappell writes that although the Tiantai school, "has the reputation of being...the most comprehensive and diversified school of Chinese Buddhism, it is almost unknown in the West" despite having a "religious framework that seemed suited to adapt to other cultures, to evolve new practices, and to universalize Buddhism". He attributes this failure of expansion to the school having "narrowed its practice to a small number of rituals" and because it has "neglected the intellectual breadth and subtlety of its founder".

See also
 Tiantai in Korea
 Tiantai in Japan
 Zhou Jichang
 Guoqing Temple
 Huayan
 Chinese Buddhism
 Chinese folk religion

References

Sources

 
 
 
 
 
 Huai-Chin, Nan (1997). Basic Buddhism: Exploring Buddhism and Zen.  York Beach, Me.: Samuel Weiser.  
 
 Ng, Yu-kwan (1990). Chih-i and Madhyamika, dissertation, Hamilton, Ontario: McMaster University
 
 Williams, Paul (2008). Mahayana Buddhism: The Doctrinal Foundations 2nd edition. Routledge
 Wu, Rujun (1993). T'ien-T'ai Buddhism and early Mādhyamika. National Foreign Language Center Technical Reports. Buddhist studies program. University of Hawaii Press. , . Source:  (accessed: Thursday April 22, 2010)
 
 Ziporyn, Brook (2004). Tiantai School, in Robert E. Buswell, ed., Encyclopedia of Buddhism, New York, McMillan. 

Bibliography
 
 
 Hurvitz, Leon (1962). Chih-i (538–597): An Introduction to the Life and Ideas of a Chinese Buddhist Monk. Mélanges Chinois et Bouddhiques XII, Bruxelles: Institut Belge des Hautes Études Chinoises
 Katō Bunno, Tamura Yoshirō, Miyasaka Kōjirō (tr.), (1975 ). The Threefold Lotus Sutra: The Sutra of Innumerable Meanings; The Sutra of the Lotus Flower of the Wonderful Law; The Sutra of Meditation on the Bodhisattva Universal Virtue, Weatherhill & Kōsei Publishing, New York & Tōkyō (Rissho Kosaikai)  PDF 
 
 
 Stevenson, Daniel B. (1986). The Four Kinds of Samādhi in Early T'ien-t'ai Buddhism. In: Peter N. Gregory: Traditions of Meditation in Chinese Buddhism Vol. 1, Honolulu: University of Hawaii Press, pp. 45–98. .
 Swanson, Paul L. (1989). Foundations of T'ien-T'ai Philosophy, Asian Humanities Press, California. .
 Ziporyn, Brook. (2016) Emptiness and Omnipresence: An Essential Introduction to Tiantai Buddhism''. Indiana University Press, Bloomington.

External links
 Buddhism in a nutshell: Tien-tai
 Digital Dictionary of Buddhism (log in with userID "guest")

 
Religious organizations established in the 6th century